The 62nd World Science Fiction Convention (Worldcon), also known as Noreascon 4, was held on 2–6 September 2004 at the Hynes Convention Center, Sheraton Boston Hotel and Boston Marriott Copley Place in Boston, Massachusetts, United States.

The convention was organized by Massachusetts Convention Fandom, Inc., and the organizing committee was chaired by Deb Geisler.

Participants 

Attendance was 6,008, out of 7,485 paid memberships.

Guests of Honor 

 Terry Pratchett (pro)
 William Tenn (pro)
 Jack Speer (fan)
 Peter Weston (fan)

Other participating writers 

In addition to the guests of honor, notable science fiction writers participating to the convention included:

 Brian Aldiss
 Kevin J. Anderson
 Lois McMaster Bujold
 Jack L. Chalker
 John Clute
 Neil Gaiman
 Elizabeth Hand
 Harry Harrison
 George R.R. Martin
 Larry Niven
 Robert Sheckley
 Robert Silverberg
 Michael Swanwick
 Harry Turtledove
 Connie Willis

Awards

2004 Hugo Awards 

 Best Novel: Paladin of Souls, by Lois McMaster Bujold
 Best Novella: "The Cookie Monster," by Vernor Vinge
 Best Novelette: "Legions in Time," by Michael Swanwick
 Best Short Story: "A Study in Emerald," by Neil Gaiman
 Best Related Book: The Chesley Awards for Science Fiction and Fantasy Art: A Retrospective, by John Grant, Elizabeth L. Humphrey, and Pamela D. Scoville
 Best Professional Editor: Gardner Dozois
 Best Professional Artist: Bob Eggleton
 Best Dramatic Presentation, Long Form: The Lord of the Rings: The Return of the King
 Best Dramatic Presentation, Short Form: Gollum’s Acceptance Speech at the 2003 MTV Movie Awards
 Best Semiprozine: Locus, edited by Charles N. Brown, Jennifer A. Hall, and Kirsten Gong-Wong
 Best Fanzine: Emerald City, edited by Cheryl Morgan
 Best Fan Writer: Dave Langford
 Best Fan Artist: Frank Wu

1954 Retro Hugo Awards 

 Best Novel: Fahrenheit 451, by Ray Bradbury
 Best Novella: "A Case of Conscience," by James Blish
 Best Novelette: "Earthman, Come Home," by James Blish
 Best Short Story: "The Nine Billion Names of God," by Arthur C. Clarke
 Best Related Book: Conquest of the Moon, by Wernher von Braun, Fred L. Whipple & Willy Ley
 Best Professional Editor: John W. Campbell, Jr.
 Best Professional Artist: Chesley Bonestell
 Best Dramatic Presentation: The War of the Worlds
 Best Fanzine: Slant, Walt Willis, editor; James White, art editor
 Best Fan Writer: Bob Tucker

Other awards 

 John W. Campbell Award for Best New Writer: Jay Lake
 Special Noreascon Four Committee Award: Erwin "Filthy Pierre" Strauss

Future site selection 

The 65th World Science Fiction Convention was awarded to Nippon 2007 in the city of Yokohama, Japan. The convention was the first to be held in Asia.

See also 

 Hugo Award
 Science fiction
 Speculative fiction
 World Science Fiction Society
 Worldcon

References

External links 

 Noreascon official website

2004 conferences
2004 in Boston
2004 in the United States
Conventions in Boston
Culture of Boston
Science fiction conventions in the United States
September 2004 events in the United States
Worldcon